The 2008 Men's Arab Volleyball Championship was held in Manama, Bahrain, from December 19 to December 23, 2008.

Teams

Competition system
The competition system of the 2008 Men's Arab Volleyball Championship is the single Round-Robin system. Each team plays once against each of the 5 remaining teams. Points are accumulated during the whole tournament, and the final ranking is determined by the total points gained.

Championship

|}

Results

|}

Final standing

Awards
MVP:  Jassem Annabhan
Best Spiker:  Marouen Garci
Best Blocker:  Fadhel Abbas
Best Server:  Ali Isshak
Best Setter:  Seifeddine Al Majid
Best Receiver:  Faraj Jumaa
Best Libero:  Aymen Harouna

References

External links
 kooora.com 
 Official AVA website

Men's Arab Volleyball Championship
Men's Arab Volleyball Championship
Arab Volleyball Championship
International volleyball competitions hosted by Bahrain